During the 1994–95 English football season, Leicester City F.C. competed in the FA Premier League.

Season summary
Leicester City finally made it back to the top flight after a seven-year exile and two successive Wembley playoff final defeats. Even with one of the country's most sought-after young managers in Brian Little, they were still tipped to go straight back down to the First Division. They would ultimately have a very shaky to indifferent start to the season, winning just two of their first 10 games, yet one of them being perhaps their finest performance of the season. On 16 October, they were 4–1 leaders against Southampton by 82 minutes; however, their leaky defense would be evident for the rest of the season (they eventually conceded 80 league goals and only kept four clean sheets all season) and within the final two minutes of that game, they conceded two goals to only narrowly win the game 4–3. By the time manager Brian Little moved to Aston Villa in November, the Foxes looked doomed, and Little's successor Mark McGhee was unable to prove the pundits wrong. Leicester were never out of the bottom two after November and were relegated with just 6 wins and only Ipswich Town below them. The sale of key player Mark Draper at least gave the club a cash windfall to reduce the financial impact of relegation.

Final league table

Results summary

Results by round

Results
Leicester City's score comes first

Legend

FA Premier League

FA Cup

League Cup

Squad

Left the club during season

Transfers

In

Out

Transfers in:  £3,105,000
Transfers out:  £750,000
Total spending:  £2,355,000

References

Leicester City F.C. seasons
Leicester City